Roberto Rivera may refer to:
 Roberto Rivera (soccer) (born 1980), Mexican soccer player
 Roberto Rivera (baseball) (born 1969), baseball player
 Roberto Rivera Ruiz (born 1950), Puerto Rican politician
 Roberto Maldonado Rivera, Puerto Rican nationalist